Al-Rabiaa (also spelled al-Rabie or Rabi'a) is a village in northwestern Syria, administratively part of the Hama Governorate, west of Hama. Nearby localities include Tayzin and Matnin to the east, Kafr al-Tun to the north, Umm al-Tuyur to the northwest, Deir al-Salib to the west, Billin to the southwest, al-Muaa to the south and Kafr Buhum to the southeast. According to the Central Bureau of Statistics (CBS), al-Rabiaa had a population of 7,508 in the 2004 census. Its inhabitants are predominantly Alawites.

History
In 1838, its inhabitants were noted to be predominantly Sunni Muslims.

References

Bibliography

 

Populated places in Hama District
Alawite communities in Syria